Zalman King (born Zalman King Lefkowitz; May 23, 1941 – February 3, 2012) was an American film director, writer, actor and producer. His films are known for incorporating sexuality, and are often categorized as erotica.

Early life
Zalman King Lefkowitz was born in Trenton, New Jersey; He was Jewish.

Acting
Zalman King Lefkowitz dropped his last name at the beginning of his acting career. In 1964, he played a gang member in "Memo from Purgatory", an episode of the television series The Alfred Hitchcock Hour written by Harlan Ellison and featuring actors James Caan and Walter Koenig. Between 1965 and 1967 King appeared in 5 episodes of the TV show Gunsmoke, once as the title character “Muley” (S12E18).

King played "The Man" in the 3rd episode of the first season of Adam-12. His character was an apparent drug addict who kidnaps an infant at gunpoint and Officer Malloy disarms him by some reverse psychology.
From September 1970 until May 1971, King played attorney Aaron Silverman on the drama The Young Lawyers, broadcast on the ABC television network. King later contributed a unique delivery to Trip with the Teacher (1975), portraying the psychopathic Al, a murderous motorbiker. His film credits included roles in Stranger on the Run (1967), You've Got to Walk It Like You Talk It or You'll Lose That Beat (1971), The Ski Bum (1971), Neither by Day nor by Night (1972), Some Call It Loving (1973), Trip with the Teacher (1975), The Passover Plot (1976), Blue Sunshine (1978), and Lee Grant's directorial debut feature film Tell Me a Riddle (1980). In 1981 he was featured as Baelon, a rescue team leader in Roger Corman's cult SF horror film, Galaxy of Terror.

Directing
King directed several films, including Two Moon Junction (1988), Wild Orchid (1990), Wild Orchid II: Two Shades of Blue (1991) and Red Shoe Diaries (1992), which became a long-running television series for Showtime network. It spawned many sequels.  He directed and co-wrote the movie In God's Hands (1998).

He collaborated with director Adrian Lyne on the film 9½ Weeks which starred Kim Basinger and Mickey Rourke. He produced (and usually directed) the television series and film ChromiumBlue.com and Showtime series Body Language. He directed the 1995 film Delta of Venus based on the book by Anaïs Nin. His last film before his death was Pleasure or Pain.

Personal life
King was married for 46 years to writer/producer Patricia Louisianna Knop, with whom he collaborated on many projects, including the scripts for Wild Orchid and 9½ Weeks. The couple had two daughters.

He died on February 3, 2012, aged 70, from cancer.

Films
 1964: The Munsters Far Out Munsters (1 episode)
 1969: Land of the Giants (TV series) (1 episode)
 1970: The Intruders (filmed in 1967)
 1975: Trip with the Teacher
 1978: Blue Sunshine
 1979: Charlie's Angels 3x14
 1981: Galaxy of Terror 1988: Two Moon Junction 1988: Wildfire 1989: Wild Orchid 1991: Wild Orchid II: Two Shades of Blue 1992: Red Shoe Diaries (TV Movie)
 1994: Boca (parts of "Wild Orchid")
 1995: Delta of Venus 1992-1996: Red Shoe Diaries (TV series) (11 episodes)
 1997 : Business for Pleasure (TV)
 1998 : Black Sea 213 1998 : A Place Called Truth 1998 : In God's Hands 1998 : Wind on Water 2000 : Red Shoe Diaries 12: Girl on a Bike 2002 : Barely Brooke (TV)
 2003 : Chromiumblue.com 2005 : Forty Deuce 2006 : Crazy Again 2006 : Dance with the Devil 2013 : Pleasure or Pain''

References

External links
 

1941 births
2012 deaths
Businesspeople from New Jersey
American cinematographers
American male film actors
Jewish American screenwriters
Film producers from New Jersey
American male screenwriters
American male television actors
American television directors
American television writers
Deaths from cancer in California
Film directors from New Jersey
Writers from Trenton, New Jersey
American male television writers
Actors from Trenton, New Jersey
Screenwriters from New Jersey
20th-century American businesspeople
21st-century American Jews
Television producers from New Jersey